The Laguna Diversion Dam is a rock-filled diversion dam on the Colorado River. It is located 13 miles northeast of Winterhaven, CA–Yuma, AZ on Imperial County route S24. Constructed between 1903 and 1905, the dam was the first dam built on the Colorado River and subsequently ended boat travel to the north.

History
After the passage of the Reclamation Act by the US Congress in 1902, the U.S. Bureau of Reclamation began constructing the dam under the Yuma Project in 1903. This project was the first development of the U.S. Reclamation Service along the Lower Colorado River and featured the Laguna Diversion Dam, a pumping station and a series of canals. On July 6, 1905 the contract to build the dam was awarded to J. G. White and Company who started construction less than two weeks later. Deliveries of cement were a problem as they had to be delivered to Yuma by rail and to the construction site by wagons or steamboat. Poor rock quality at local quarries also posed a problem that consistently delayed construction, 50% of the weak rock was unusable. Even after their contract was supplemented to encompass the rock quality delays, J. G. White and Company still did not meet their deadline and the Bureau of Reclamation took over construction in early 1907.

To solve the cement delivery problems, the Bureau of Reclamation had built a levee on the California side on the dam that was topped by a rail-line by March 1908. Beforehand, they had also gained the cooperation of the Southern Pacific Railroad who agreed to deliver cement directly at the dam site. The rock problem was solved when the Bureau raised the upstream and downstream cofferdams with rock waste and topped them with rail lines that could deliver rock-fill much faster. By December 1908, the water bypass around the dam was complete and workers began to pour the rock-fill. Three large concrete walls supported by 6-inch sheet-wood pilings were built across the river for the dam's foundation. Rock-fill was placed in between and on the outsides of these walls for support. The California sluiceway consisted of three iron gates while the Arizona had one. Mexican-Americans mostly worked on the dam while a few Native American Indians did as well. Skilled white-labor worked in the cooler months.

The Laguna Dam's design and size made it a peculiar structure for the time. The dam, a weir, was merely 43 ft. tall, almost two-thirds of which were built below the riverbed. Subsequently, the dam only raised the river ten feet. Modifications to the dam's downstream talus were done between 1923–1924. After the creation of the Imperial Dam 5-miles upstream, the Laguna Diversion Dam was no longer needed and its California diversion outlets were closed on June 23, 1948. Since then, the dam serves to regulate the outflows of the Imperial Dam and often does not impound a large reservoir.

Swastika design

The Laguna Dam was decorated with numerous swastikas, thus developing the eventual nickname "Swastika Dam." The swastikas present on this structure were not put there for any sort of National Socialist ("Nazi"), or otherwise racist or socio-political reasons. They were placed there prior to Adolf Hitler's effectively having altered the popular meaning of the swastika within Western societies.

Fish species
 Largemouth Bass
 Striped Bass
 Crappie
 Bullhead catfish
 Catfish (Channel)
 Catfish (Flathead)
 Tilapia
 Redear Sunfish
 Green Sunfish 
 Bluegill Sunfish
 Mullet
 Carp
 Bullfrogs

See also
 Mittry Lake – Created by the dam.
 County Route S24

References

 
 Map of Laguna Diversion Dam

External links 

USBR Laguna Diversion Dam Website

Swastika Dam article by Walter Smoter Frank
USBR History of Laguna Dam
Arizona Lake Levels

Dams in California
Dams in Arizona
Dams of the Lower Colorado River Valley
Dams on the Colorado River
Buildings and structures in Imperial County, California
Winterhaven, California
Buildings and structures in Yuma County, Arizona
United States Bureau of Reclamation dams
Dams completed in 1905
Historic American Engineering Record in Arizona
1905 establishments in Arizona Territory
1905 establishments in California